Vanin may refer to:

 Feodosy Vanin (1914–2009), Soviet marathon runner
 Ronaldo Vanin (born 1983), Brazilian footballer
 Vasili Vasilyevich Vanin (1898–1951), Russian stage and film actor of the Soviet era.
 Vanin, Iran, a village in Isfahan Province, Iran